The Jewish Museum of Switzerland in Basel provides an overview of the religious and everyday history of the Jews in Basel and Switzerland using objects of ritual, art and everyday culture from the Middle Ages to the present.

History 
The museum opened in 1966 as the first Jewish museum in German-speaking Europe after the Second World War. The initiative came from members of Espérance (a chevra kadisha) who visited Cologne to see the exhibition "Monumenta Judaica" in 1963/64. They discovered that many of the ritual objects on display came from the Basel Judaica collection and decided to present these objects permanently in a Jewish museum in Basel.

When it first opened, the museum occupied two rooms at Kornhausgasse 8. The interior designer Christoph Bernoulli furnished the space in an “objective” style. The founding director, Dr. Katia Guth-Dreyfus, headed the museum for four decades. In 2010 she was succeeded by Dr. Gaby Knoch-Mund. In 2015, Dr. Naomi Lubrich took over as director of the Jewish Museum of Switzerland.

Since 2016, Lubrich has re-organized the permanent exhibit, attracted new visitors and gained the museum media attention.

Collection
The first objects shown in the Jewish Museum's exhibition were Judaica collected by the Swiss Museum of Folklore (now Museum der Kulturen Basel). The museum's collection expanded after 1966 to include objects from Basel and the Upper Rhine, from the two Surbtal villages Endingen and Lengnau as well as from the remainder of Switzerland and Europe. A noteworthy find, when it comes to the Surbtal valley, are the “Lengnau Mappot", a collection of 218 Torah binders that span almost three centuries, making them the largest cohesive collection of mappot from a known community.

Highlights of the museum's collection include silver ceremonial objects, richly embroidered textiles from the 17th to the 20th centuries and documents from the cultural history of the Jews in Switzerland. The monumental medieval gravestones and the Basel Hebrew prints are important historical testimonies. Documents on the Basel Zionist Congresses and original letters from Theodor Herzl, the author of "Der Judenstaat", show Basel as a city that made world politics. The museum is also collecting contemporary objects — Judaica, art, and objects from everyday life.

Exhibitions

1976: 10 Years Jewish Museum of Switzerland (10 Jahre Jüdisches Museum der Schweiz)

1999: Tefillin

1999-2000: Signs of the Zodiac (Tierkreiszeichen)

2000: The Rabbis Ris. A Family in the Region (Die Rabbiner Ris. Eine Familie in der Region)

2002: Mesusot

2002-2003: Dining on Shabbat (Speisen am Schabbat)

2003-2004: Jewish Wedding Contracts from the Braginsky Collection, Zurich (Jüdische Hochzeitsverträge aus der Braginsky Collection, Zürich)

2004-2005: Anne Frank. A Family History across Borders (Anne Frank. Eine Familiengeschichte über Grenzen)

2005-2006: Chest on the Move. A Jewish Family History from Frankfurt and Basel (Truhe auf Wanderschaft. Eine jüdische Familiengeschichte aus Frankfurt und Basel)

2006-2007: Bringing it into the Light. Acquisitions of the Last 10 Years (Ins Licht gerückt. Sammlungszugänge der letzten 10 Jahre)

2007-2008: Endingen-Lengnau. Traces of the Jewish Rural Communities in Aargau (Endingen-Lengnau. Auf den Spuren der jüdischen Landgemeinden im Aargau)

2009-2009: Strange. Objects that are out of Line (Merkwürdig. Objekte, die aus der Reihe tanzen)

2010-2016: Congratulations. Special Exhibition on the 150th Birthday of Theodor Herzl (HERZLichen Glückwunsch. Sonderausstellung zum 150. Geburtstag von Theodor Herzl )

2010-2014: "...and Hanna and Sarah" installation by Renée Levy („…und Hanna und Sarah“ Installation von Renée Levy)

2011: From New Moon to Full Moon (Von Neumond zu Vollmond)

2011-2012: In Transition. Bar and Bat Mitzvah (Am Übergang. Bar und Bat Mitzwa)

2012: 1001 Amulet. Protection and Magic - Faith or Superstition? (1001 Amulett. Schutz und Magie – Glaube oder Aberglaube?)

2014-2016: Wanted. Found. Partnership and Love in Judaism (Gesucht. Gefunden. Partnerschaft und Liebe im Judentum)

2016: Swiss Jews. 150 Years of Equal Rights / Voices for Emancipation (Schweizer Juden. 150 Jahre Gleichberechtigung / Stimmen zur Emanzipation)

2016: Jubilee! The Jewish Museum of Switzerland turns 50 (Jubiläum! Das Jüdische Museum der Schweiz wird 50)

2017: Altland. Theodor Herzls European Heritage (Altland. Theodor Herzls europäisches Erbe)

2017: Art after Chagall. The Century after the Breakthrough (in cooperation with Kunstmuseum Basel) (Kunst nach Chagall. Das Jahrhundert nach dem Durchbruch (in Zusammenarbeit mit dem Kunstmuseum Basel))

2018-2019: The Diary. How Otto Frank Brought Anne's Voice from Basel to the World (Das Tagebuch. Wie Otto Frank Annes Stimme aus Basel in die Welt brachte)

2019: ISREALITIES. Seven Photographic Journeys (ISREALITIES. Sieben fotografische Reisen)

2019-2020: Passports, Profiteers, Police. A Swiss War Secret (Pässe, Profiteure, Polizei. Ein Schweizer Kriegsgeheimnis)

2020: Pandemics and Poetics. A Jewish Dictionary (online) (Pandemie und Poesie. Ein jüdisches Lexikon (online))

2021–2024: Literally Jewish: A lexicological history. Installation in the new location at Vesalgasse 5.

Publications

2003: Jüdische Hochzeitsverträge aus Italien

2006: Truhe auf Wanderschaft. Eine jüdische Familiengeschichte aus Frankfurt und Basel

2006: Ins Licht gerückt. Sammlungszugänge der letzten 10 Jahre

2007: Endingen-Lengnau. Auf den Spuren der jüdischen Landgemeinden im Aargau

2010: HERZLichen Glückwunsch! Sonderausstellung zum 150. Geburtstag von Theodor Herzl

2011: Gaby Knoch-Mund et al., Am Übergang. Bar und Bat Mizwa. Wie werden jüdische Kinder und Jugendliche erwachsen? Basel. .

2013: 1001 Amulett. Schutz und Magie – Glaube oder Aberglaube

2014: Gaby Knoch-Mund, Gesucht. Gefunden. Partnerschaft und Liebe im Judentum, Basel. .

2018: Caspar Battegay, Naomi Lubrich, Jüdische Schweiz. 50 Objekte erzählen Geschichte / Jewish Switzerland: 50 Objects Tell their Stories, Basel, Christoph Merian Verlag. 

2020: Fabio Luks, CHAI – חי. Oder wenn Grabsteine vom Leben erzählen/CHAI - חי. Or when Gravestones Speak of Life, Biel, edition clandestin. .

2020: Pandemie und Poesie. Ein jüdisches Lexikon. Pandemics and Poetics. A Jewish Dictionary. Biel, edition clandestin. 

2021: Naomi Lubrich: Passports, Profiteers, Police. A Swiss War Secret. edition clandestin ISBN 978-3-907262-09-2

2022: Naomi Lubrich (Ed.): Birth Culture: Artifacts from rural Switzerland and Environs. Schwabe Verlag, Basel.  

2022: Naomi Lubrich (Ed.): What's in a Name? 25 Jewish Stories. edition clandestin,

See also
Museums in Basel
Jews in Switzerland

References

External links
 Jewish Museum of Switzerland website
 JewishEurope.org
 Jewish-Heritage-Europe.eu
 Israel Science and Technology Directory.com
 MerianVerlag.ch

Jews and Judaism in Basel
Jewish museums
Museums in Basel